Last Man in Tower is a 2011 novel by Indian writer Aravind Adiga. Published by HarperCollins India, it was the third published book and second published novel by Adiga. It tells the story of a struggle for a slice of shining Mumbai real estate. The protagonist of the novel is a retired schoolteacher named Yogesh A. Murthy, who is affectionately known as Masterji.

A prominent builder offers to buy out the entire apartment block. All of the occupants agree, except for Masterji. This creates a problem for the builder and the other residents.

References

External links
 Aravind Adiga Official website
 HarperCollins Official website
 Rajiv Arora, Review in The Hindustan Times
 Ceri Radford, Review in The Daily Telegraph
 Randy Boyagoda, Review in Globe and Mail
 Samhita Arni, Review in Daily News and Analysis
 Peter Carty, Review in The Independent

2011 Indian novels
Books by Aravind Adiga
Novels set in Mumbai
Fourth Estate books